The 1989–90 Eliteserien season was the 33rd season of ice hockey in Denmark. Eight teams participated in the league, and the Rødovre Mighty Bulls won the championship. Vojens IK was relegated to the 1. division.

Regular season

Playoffs
The top 4 teams from the regular season qualified for the playoffs. The Rødovre Mighty Bulls defeated Herning IK in the final, and the Frederikshavn White Hawks defeated Hellerup IK in the 3rd place game.

External links
Season on eliteprospects.com

Dan
1989-90
1989 in Danish sport
1990 in Danish sport